Agahar is a small village in the Kangra District of Himachal Pradesh, with a population of 829 people.  It is located near Punjab border (Talwara Town) and @ 44 km from Pathankot and 18.5 km from Talwara Township. It comes under Rey Khas Panchayat.

References

Villages in Kangra district